The following is a list of massacres that have occurred in Japan and its predecessor entities ranging back to the Tokugawa shogunate (Some historical numbers may be approximate). The massacres are grouped into different time periods. Massacres have become a growing problem in contemporary Japan in recent years, with at least 110+ deaths during the 2010s. 

Most notably, the 2019 Kyoto Animation arson attack claimed at least 36 lives and injured an additional 34. It is one of the deadliest massacres in Japan since the end of World War II and the deadliest building fire in Japan since the 2001 Myojo 56 building fire. It was considered "suicidal terrorism" by one criminology professor at Rissho University, as the attack was reportedly intended to be a suicide mission by the suspect. In December 2021, another arson attack occurred, this time at a building in Osaka, specifically at a psychiatric clinic located on the fourth floor. It killed 25 and injured an additional 3. The suspect, who died in hospital two weeks later, is believed to have been inspired by the 2019 attack in Kyoto.

Massacres

Tokugawa shogunate (1603–1868)

Empire of Japan (1868–1947)

Occupied Japan (1947–1952)

State of Japan (1952–present)

References

External links
Factbox: Recent mass killings in Japan

Massacres
Japan

Massacres